Adam Blake may refer to:
 Adam Blake, real life name of superhero Captain Comet
 Adam Blake (musician) (born 1976), English  producer, musician and songwriter